Fateko Jutta  is a 2017 drama and  Comedy film directed by Bikash Sharma and produced by Arjun Kumar. The film stars Saugat Malla, Priyanka Karki, Kameshwor Chaurasiya and Rabindra Jha in lead roles. The film was released on November 3, 2017.

Plots

Cast

 Saugat Malla
 Priyanka Karki
 Kameshwor Chaurasiya
 Rabindra Jha

Crew
Music: Shankar Thapa, Prabesh Malik
Lyrics: 
Singers: Prabesh Malik, Mina
Story: Niroj Maharjan
Editor: 
Producer: Arjun Kumar
Director: Nikesh Khadka

References

2010s Nepali-language films
Nepalese romantic comedy films